The Oak Circle Historic District is a historic district in Wilmette, Illinois, United States. It primarily consists of fifteen single-family homes representative of the Prairie School and Craftsman styles of architecture. The Oak Circle Historic District was added to the National Register of Historic Places on June 21, 2001; it was the first historic district to be designated in Wilmette.

Geography
Twenty-six properties are located along Oak Circle; fifteen of these are homes, and the other eleven are detached garages alongside the homes. Many of the lots include trees, which are considered to contribute to the character of the district.

History
The first fourteen homes on Oak Circle were platted in 1907 as part of Joseph Woodruff's Addition to Wilmette. Oak Circle was paved in 1911, and homes on the west side of the street were likely built between 1917 and 1920; however, the permits indicating the precise dates of their construction were lost in the 1920 Palm Sunday tornado outbreak. The homes on the east side of Oak Circle were constructed after 1920. A. W. Dickinson added a lot to Oak Circle in 1920 and constructed the houses on the east side; their similarity to the western houses suggests Dickinson built those houses as well.

Architecture

Twelve of the fifteen homes in the Oak Circle Historic District are bungalows, and they exhibit various elements of the Craftsman and Prairie School movements. Craftsman elements in the houses generally included low, gabled roofs, overhanging eaves, decorative beams, and materials such as wood, stone and brick. The Prairie School was reflected in the homes' bands of windows with geometric glazed patterns; the houses originally included an average of 40 of these windows, many of which had colored glass. Colonial Revival and Italian Renaissance influences can also be seen in the bungalow at 340 Oak Circle, the last of the bungalows to be built. Three of the bungalows are Airplane Bungalows, a style in which the upper story of the home sits above the lower story like a cockpit above the wings of an airplane. The twelve bungalows are a mix of one-story and one-and-a-half-story homes; no two homes on Oak Circle are exactly alike. The remaining three homes are two-story homes which also demonstrate the Craftsman and Prairie School influences seen in the other homes. Several of the eleven garages in the district are also contributing properties; the garages at 328, 332, and 344 Oak Circle have architectural details similar to their respective houses.

References

Buildings and structures in Wilmette, Illinois
Houses on the National Register of Historic Places in Cook County, Illinois
Prairie School architecture in Illinois
Historic districts on the National Register of Historic Places in Illinois